Eriostepta nigripuncta is a moth of the family Erebidae. It was described by James John Joicey and George Talbot in 1918, originally under the genus Araeomolis. It is found in French Guiana, Peru and Bolivia.

References

Further reading
 

Phaegopterina
Moths described in 1918